Terex Corporation is an American worldwide manufacturer of lifting and material-handling plant for a variety of industries including construction, infrastructure, quarrying, recycling, energy, mining, shipping, transportation, refining and utilities. The company's major business segments include aerial work platforms, construction cranes, bulk-material hauling machines, road-paving machines, and container-port cranes.

Corporate history

General Motors
The Terex name has its origin as a division of General Motors. Due to a 1968 Justice Department ruling, General Motors was required to stop manufacturing and selling off-highway trucks in the United States for four years and divest the Euclid brand name. GM coined the "Terex" name in 1968 from the Latin words "terra" (earth) and "rex" (king) for its construction equipment products and trucks not covered by the ruling.

IBH Holding
General Motors sold the Terex division to German firm IBH Holding AG led by Horst-Dieter Esch de in 1980. After IBH Holding AG declared bankruptcy in 1983, ownership of Terex returned to General Motors and was organized as Terex Equipment Limited (Scotland), Terex do Brasil Limitada (Belo Horizonte, Brazil), and Terex USA (Hudson, Ohio).

Randolph W. Lenz
American entrepreneur Randolph W. Lenz purchased Terex USA from GM in 1986, then exercised an option to purchase Terex Equipment Limited in 1987. In 1988, Lenz merged his primary construction equipment asset, Northwest Engineering Company, into Terex Corporation, making Terex Corporation the parent corporation. The construction assets acquired by Lenz throughout the 1980s including Northwest Engineering Company, Unit Rig (brands Dart Truck Company), Terex Equipment Limited, and Koehring Cranes and Excavators, Inc. all became assets of Terex Corporation.

Acquisitions and sales
Due to a strategy of acquisitions, Terex Corporation has owned more than 50 different brands.

The period of 1996–2003 was characterized by a large number of acquisitions under president and CEO Ron DeFeo, with the group buying into multiple new markets and expanding its presence in existing markets.

 In 1999, Terex acquired Powerscreen PLC, a Northern Ireland-based group of companies. These companies included Powerscreen International, Finlay Hydrascreens, Moffet Mountie, BL Pegson, as well as several others. Powerscreen and newly named Terex Finlay produce mobile crushing, screening, washing and recycling equipment. Their products are used in industries such as construction, quarrying, mining, landfill, aggregates, topsoil, compost/wood chips, asphalt, rock crushing, and recycling. Later in 1999, Terex went on to acquire Cedarapids from Raytheon. This provided road-building equipment to match compaction acquisitions within the earlier deal such as Powerscreen subsidiary Benford Americas.
 In 2001, Terex acquired CMI Roadbuilding and Australian rock crusher specialist Jaques Limited.
 In 2002, Terex acquired Genie Industries, a leading manufacturer of aerial work platforms. Genie Industries became known as the Genie brand within the aerial work platforms segment.
 In 2003, Terex acquired the majority ownership (71%) of Tatra, but as of late 2006 sold off that share to Blue River S.R.O. for about $26.2 million in cash.

The period of 2010–2017, following the financial crisis of 2007–2008, was characterized by a large number of divestitures from the mining, road building and construction markets. These business units had accounted for just 5% of group annual revenues and departing these sectors has allowed Terex to focus on their core businesses of cranes, aerial platforms and material handling and processing.

 In February 2010, Terex announced the sale of its mining equipment division to Bucyrus International Inc. for US$1.3 billion.
 In December 2013, Volvo Construction Equipment (VCE) agreed to pay US$160m for Terex Trucks. In September 2021 VCE rebranded the business Rokbak.
 In 2013, Terex sold the CMI and Cedarapids units to Fayat Group, the parent company of BOMAG and Marini. BOMAG retained joint-branding on the asphalt paver products, whilst the Cedarapids asphalt plants were moved underneath CMI.
 In April 2015, Terex purchased Continental Biomass Industries (CBI) of Newton, NH, a prominent manufacturer of biomass processing equipment.
 In June 2016, Terex announced the sale of the former Schaeff business in Germany to Yanmar Holdings.
 In December 2016, Terex announced the sale of the former Fermec business in Coventry, England to French manufacturer Mecalac.
 In March 2017, Terex announced the sale of their Indian construction arm to Manitou.

Joint ventures
GAZ Group of Russia operates a joint venture with Terex (RM-Terex). The joint venture is involved in a wide range of works in the road, civil and industrial construction, utilities, mining, forestry, oil and gas industry.

Criticism
In 1992 American businessman Richard Carl Fuisz reported to the Operations Subcommittee of the House Committee on Agriculture that he witnessed the construction of military vehicles at a Terex owned facility in Scotland in 1987. Fuisz alleged that Terex employees reported that the vehicles were manufactured at the request of the CIA and British Intelligence and were destined for service within the Iraqi military. Terex denied the allegations and, in 1992, filed a libel complaint against Fuisz and Seymour M. Hersh, writer of a New York Times article covering Fuisz's allegations. After several investigations, including a 16-month-long federal task force investigation, no legal charges were filed against Terex. The New York Times, in an editor's note on 7 December 1995, said, "The article should never have suggested that Terex has ever supplied Scud missile launchers to Iraq, and The Times regrets any damage that may have resulted to Terex from any false impression the article may have caused."

Products 
 Terex Titan

Gallery

References

External links 

 Terex Collection Hudson Library & Historical Society

Companies based in Norwalk, Connecticut
Companies listed on the New York Stock Exchange
Construction equipment manufacturers of the United States
Former General Motors subsidiaries
Manufacturing companies based in Connecticut
Manufacturing companies established in 1933
1933 establishments in Connecticut
Mining equipment companies